Santinho Lopes Monteiro (born 16 February 1979 in Rotterdam, Netherlands) is Cape Verdean-Dutch football player. He is currently without a club.

In the 1998-99 season, he made his professional debut for RKC Waalwijk. He joined RBC Roosendaal for the second half of the season, and in 1999, he moved to Excelsior, where he would play for two seasons. In 2001, he joined then Hoofdklasse amateur club AGOVV Apeldoorn. He was part of the club when it was admitted to the Eerste Divisie in 2003. His contract was disbanded by the club in 2007, after "unprofessionalism."

References

External links
voetbal international profile

1979 births
Living people
Dutch footballers
Footballers from Rotterdam
Dutch sportspeople of Cape Verdean descent
RKC Waalwijk players
RBC Roosendaal players
Excelsior Rotterdam players
AGOVV Apeldoorn players
Eredivisie players
Eerste Divisie players
Association football midfielders

Dutch people of Cape Verdean descent